Oestrophasia is a genus of bristle flies in the family Tachinidae.

Species
Oestrophasia calva Coquillett, 1902
Oestrophasia clausa Brauer & von Bergenstamm, 1889
Oestrophasia sabroskyi (Guimarães, 1977)
Oestrophasia signifera (Wulp, 1890)
Oestrophasia thompsoni Guimaraes, 1977
Oestrophasia uncana (Fabricius, 1805)

References

Dexiinae
Taxa named by Friedrich Moritz Brauer
Taxa named by Julius von Bergenstamm
Tachinidae genera
Diptera of South America
Diptera of North America